Liangwu railway station is a railway station currently being built in Liangwu Township, Lichuan City, Enshi, Hubei Province in China. It will be the junction station where the Yuli Railway (Chongqing-Lichuan) will join the Yiwan Railway (Yichang-Wanzhou).

Railway stations in Hubei